Luis Cuenca García (6 December 1921 – 21 January 2004) was a Spanish actor.

Partial filmography

Quiéreme con música (1957)
¿Pena de muerte? (1961) - Barbero
Las travesuras de Morucha (1962) - Pepe
Un rincón para querernos (1964) - Sacamuelas
Toto of Arabia (1965) - El Kasser
Victòria! La gran aventura d'un poble (1983)
Victòria! 2: La disbauxa del 17 (1993)
Victòria! 3: El seny i la rauxa (1984)
The Cheerful Colsada Girls (1984) - Manolo
Perras callejeras (1985) - Don Eulogio
El donante (1985) - Manuel Torrecilla (uncredited)
Suspiros de España (y Portugal) (1995) - Abad
Cachito (1996) - Señor
The Good Life (1996) - Abuelo
Airbag (1997) - Souza
Mátame mucho (1998) - Bartolo
Grandes ocasiones (1998) - Abuelo
En dag til i solen (1998) - Watchmaker
Torrente, el brazo tonto de la ley (1998) - Barman
A Time for Defiance (1998) - Melquíades
Obra maestra (2000) - Damián
Soldiers of Salamina (2003) - Padre Lola
El furgón (2003) - Abogado
Dos tipos duros (2003) - Padre de Aramis
¡Buen viaje, excelencia! (2003)
Di que sí (2004) - Arturo (final film role)

Spanish male television actors
1921 births
2004 deaths
Best Supporting Actor Goya Award winners
20th-century Spanish male actors
21st-century Spanish male actors